Joaquín Fernández Prida (March 31, 1863 in Oviedo, Spain – October 29, 1942 in Madrid, Spain) was a Spanish lawyer and politician who served as Minister of State in 1922, during the reign of King Alfonso XIII of Spain.

References

Sources
Personal dossier of D. Joaquín Fernández Prida. Spanish Senate

Foreign ministers of Spain
1863 births
1942 deaths
Conservative Party (Spain) politicians
Justice ministers of Spain
Interior ministers of Spain